The Cross River State Executive Council (also known as, the Cabinet of Cross River State) is the highest governmental body that plays important roles in the Government of Cross River State, Nigeria, headed by the Governor of Cross River State. The Council consists of the Governor, Deputy Governor, Secretary to the State Government, and Commissioners who are Chief Executive Officers of Ministries in the State.

Functions
The Executive Council exists to advise and direct the Governor. Their appointment as members of the Executive Council gives them the authority to execute power over their fields.

Current cabinet
The current Executive Council is serving under the Benedict Ayade administration.

References

Cross River
Politics of Cross River State